Adams County is the westernmost county in the U.S. state of Illinois. As of the 2020 census, the population was 65,737. Its county seat is Quincy. Adams County is part of the Quincy, IL–MO Micropolitan Statistical Area.

History
Adams County was formed in 1825 out of Pike County. Its name is in honor of the sixth President of the United States, John Quincy Adams.

Geography

Adjacent counties
 Hancock County - north
 Brown County - east
 Schuyler County - east
 Pike County - south
 Marion County, Missouri - west
 Lewis County, Missouri - west

Public transit
 Quincy Transit Lines
 Quincy station
 Burlington Trailways
 List of intercity bus stops in Illinois

Major highways

  Interstate 172
  US Route 24
  US Route 36
  Illinois Route 57
  Illinois Route 61
  Illinois Route 94
  Illinois Route 96
  Illinois Route 104
  Illinois Route 336

National protected area
 Great River National Wildlife Refuge (part)

Climate and weather 

Demographics

As of the 2020 United States Census, there were 65,737 people, 27,199 households, and 17,398 families residing in the county. The racial makeup of the county was 89.5% white, 3.8% black or African American, 0.8% Asian, 0.2% American Indian, 0.8% from other races, and 4.9% from two or more races. Those of Hispanic or Latino origin made up 2.0% of the population. The most common reported ancestries were, German (35.9%), Irish (11.1%), English (8.1%), and  American (7.4%).

Of the 27,199 households, 25.1% had children under the age of 18 living with them, 50.2% were married couples living together, 9.8% had a female householder with no husband present, 36.0% were non-families. 30.5% of all households were made up of individuals, and 15.4% had someone living alone who was 65 years of age or older. The average household size was 2.36 and the average family size was 2.95.

In the county, the population was spread out, with 22.6% under the age of 18, 7.5% from 18 to 24, 23.7% from 25 to 44, 25.9% from 45 to 64, and 20.2% who were 65 years of age or older. The median age was 41.4 years. For every 100 females, there were 96.4 males. For every 100 females age 18 and over, there were 93.5 males.

The median income for a household in the county was $55,052 and the median income for a family was $72,091. Males had a median income of $41,852 versus $29,404 for females. The per capita income for the county was $31,035. About 9.4% of families and 12.5% of the population were below the poverty line, including 17.7% of those under age 18 and 9.9% of those age 65 or over.

2020 Census

Communities

City
 Quincy (seat)

Villages

 Camp Point
 Clayton
 Coatsburg
 Columbus
 Golden
 La Prairie
 Liberty
 Lima
 Loraine
 Mendon
 Payson
 Plainville
 Ursa

Unincorporated communities

 Adams
 Beverly
 Bigneck
 Blacks
 Bloomfield
 Burton
 Chatton
 Cliola
 Country Meadows
 Ewbanks
 Fall Creek
 Fowler
 Hickory Grove
 Kellerville
 Kingston
 Marblehead
 Marcelline
 Meyer
 North Quincy
 Paloma
 Richfield
 Rock Creek
 Sheridan Estates
 Spring Valley
 Woodville

Townships

Adams County is divided into twenty-three townships:

 Beverly
 Burton
 Camp Point
 Clayton
 Columbus
 Concord
 Ellington
 Fall Creek
 Gilmer
 Honey Creek
 Houston
 Keene
 Liberty
 Lima
 McKee
 Melrose
 Mendon
 Northeast
 Payson
 Quincy
 Richfield
 Riverside
 Ursa

Politics

Adams County, positioned in a primarily rural section of Illinois is culturally isolated from Chicago, and therefore more conservative than the state's northeastern corner. Quincy, the county seat, holds a high number of socially conservative Catholics and likewise is the home to the campus of Quincy University, a private Catholic liberal arts college, and the Western Catholic Union.

The county is part of the historic belt of German settlement extending into the Missouri Rhineland. Since it was antagonistic to the Yankee northeast of Illinois, it voted solidly Democratic until 1892. After being a swing county in the first half of the twentieth century, Adams County has been a Republican stronghold. It has gone Republican in all but five presidential elections since 1920. The county last supported a Democrat in 1964, when it voted for Lyndon Johnson. The county regularly rejects Democrats at the state level as well; it has not supported a Democrat for Governor of Illinois since Adlai Stevenson II in 1948, and there are no elected Democrats above the county level. Notably, while it voted for Barack Obama in his 2004 Senate campaign, he lost it by wide margins in both of his presidential bids.

The county is part of Illinois's 18th congressional district, currently represented by Republican Darin LaHood. For the Illinois House of Representatives, the county is located in the 94th district, represented by Republican Randy Frese. The county is located in the 47th district of the Illinois Senate, represented by Republican Jil Tracy.

Education

Unified school districts
 Central Community Unit School District 3
 Liberty Community Unit School District 2
 Mendon Community Unit School District 4
 Payson Community Unit School District 1
 Quincy Public School District 172

Private schools
 Blessed Sacrament Catholic School 
 Chaddock School 
 Quincy Christian School
 Quincy Notre Dame High School
 St. Dominic Catholic School 
 St. Francis Solanus Catholic School 
 St. James Lutheran School 
 St. Peter Catholic School

Colleges and universities
 Blessing-Rieman College of Nursing
 John Wood Community College
 Quincy University

Attractions

 Adams County Fair 
 Bayview Bridge
 Burton Cave 
 Fall Creek Scenic Park
 Golden Windmill 
 John Wood Mansion
 Saukenauk Scout Reservation 
 Siloam Springs State Park
 Spirit Knob Winery 
 Villa Katharine 
 Wavering Park

See also
 National Register of Historic Places listings in Adams County, Illinois

References

External links

 Adams County website
 Adams County GIS Website
 Great River Genealogical Society
 United States Census Bureau 2007 TIGER/Line Shapefiles
 United States Board on Geographic Names (GNIS)
 United States National Atlas

 
Illinois counties
1825 establishments in Illinois
Illinois counties on the Mississippi River
Populated places established in 1825
Quincy–Hannibal area
Quincy, Illinois micropolitan area